Davidon is a surname. Notable people with the surname include:

Ruth Davidon (born 1964), American rower
William C. Davidon (1927–2013), American physicist and activist

See also
Davidson (name)